Life of a Kid in the Ghetto is the debut studio album by the Boston-based rap group Ed O.G. & Da Bulldogs. It was released on March 5, 1991, via PWL America/Mercury Records/PolyGram. The album peaked at number 166 on the Billboard 200 and number 21 on the Top R&B/Hip-Hop Albums chart. The album spawned three singles: "Bug-a-Boo" (which peaked at #25 on Hot Rap Songs), "I Got to Have It" (which peaked at #83 on Hot R&B/Hip-Hop Songs and #1 on Hot Rap Songs), and "Be a Father to Your Child" (which peaked at #58 on Hot R&B/Hip-Hop Songs and #5 on Hot Rap Songs).

Track listing

References

External links

1991 debut albums
Ed O.G. albums
Mercury Records albums